The 2015–16 season is Dinamo Zagreb's 25th season in the Croatian First Division and 104th year in existence as a football club.

Squad

Out on loan

Friendlies

Pre-season

Mid-season

Competitions

MAXtv Prva Liga

League table

Results summary

Results by round

Matches

Source: Croatian Football Federation

Croatian Cup

Source: Croatian Football Federation

UEFA Champions League

Qualifying round

Group stage

Player seasonal records
Updated 14 May 2016. Competitive matches only.

Goals

Source: Competitive matches

References

2015–16
Croatian football clubs 2015–16 season
Dinamo Zagreb
2015-16